Albinvest is the Government of Albania organization that promotes and attracts foreign direct investment into Albania. Albinvest assists companies planning to invest in Albania or to expand their Albanian operations.

Participation in the UN Global Compact                                                                                                                                                                                                                 

The Albinvest corporation was a participant in the United Nations Global Compact until 2009 when the company was De-Listed and expelled due to a lack of communication on the part of Evis Shani. It is currently unknown if this was an intentional decision.

References

External links
 Albinvest homepage 

 
 
Investment promotion agencies
Financial regulatory authorities of Albania